Gisikon-Root railway station is a railway station in the municipality of Root, in the Swiss canton of Lucerne. It is an intermediate stop on the standard gauge Zug–Lucerne line of Swiss Federal Railways.

Services 
The following services stop at Gisikon-Root:

References

External links 
 
 

Railway stations in the canton of Lucerne
Swiss Federal Railways stations